An autosome is any chromosome that is not a sex chromosome. The members of an autosome pair in a diploid cell have the same morphology, unlike those in allosomal (sex chromosome) pairs, which may have different structures. The DNA in autosomes is collectively known as atDNA or auDNA.

For example, humans have a diploid genome that usually contains 22 pairs of autosomes and one allosome pair (46 chromosomes total). The autosome pairs are labeled with numbers (1–22 in humans) roughly in order of their sizes in base pairs, while allosomes are labelled with their letters. By contrast, the allosome pair consists of two X chromosomes in females or one X and one Y chromosome in males. Unusual combinations of XYY, XXY, XXX, XXXX, XXXXX or XXYY, among other Salome combinations, are known to occur and usually cause developmental abnormalities.

Autosomes still contain sexual determination genes even though they are not sex chromosomes. For example, the SRY gene on the Y chromosome encodes the transcription factor TDF and is vital for male sex determination during development. TDF functions by activating the SOX9 gene on chromosome 17, so mutations of the SOX9 gene can cause humans with an ordinary Y chromosome to develop as females.

All human autosomes have been identified and mapped by extracting the chromosomes from a cell arrested in metaphase or prometaphase and then staining them with a type of dye (most commonly, Giemsa). These chromosomes are typically viewed as karyograms for easy comparison. Clinical geneticists can compare the karyogram of an individual to a reference karyogram to discover the cytogenetic basis of certain phenotypes. For example, the karyogram of someone with Patau Syndrome would show that they possess three copies of chromosome 13. Karyograms and staining techniques can only detect large-scale disruptions to chromosomes—chromosomal aberrations smaller than a few million base pairs generally cannot be seen on a karyogram.

Autosomal genetic disorders 

Autosomal genetic disorders can arise due to a number of causes, some of the most common being nondisjunction in parental germ cells or Mendelian inheritance of deleterious alleles from parents. Autosomal genetic disorders which exhibit Mendelian inheritance can be inherited either in an autosomal dominant or recessive fashion. These disorders manifest in and are passed on by either sex with equal frequency. Autosomal dominant disorders are often present in both parent and child, as the child needs to inherit only one copy of the deleterious allele to manifest the disease. Autosomal recessive diseases, however, require two copies of the deleterious allele for the disease to manifest. Because it is possible to possess one copy of a deleterious allele without presenting a disease phenotype, two phenotypically normal parents can have a child with the disease if both parents are carriers (also known as heterozygotes) for the condition.

Autosomal aneuploidy can also result in disease conditions. Aneuploidy of autosomes is not well tolerated and usually results in miscarriage of the developing fetus. Fetuses with aneuploidy of gene-rich chromosomes—such as chromosome 1—never survive to term, and fetuses with aneuploidy of gene-poor chromosomes—such as chromosome 21— are still miscarried over 23% of the time. Possessing a single copy of an autosome (known as a monosomy) is nearly always incompatible with life, though very rarely some monosomies can survive past birth. Having three copies of an autosome (known as a trisomy) is far more compatible with life, however. A common example is Down syndrome, which is caused by possessing three copies of chromosome 21 instead of the usual two.

Partial aneuploidy can also occur as a result of unbalanced translocations during meiosis. Deletions of part of a chromosome cause partial monosomies, while duplications can cause partial trisomies. If the duplication or deletion is large enough, it can be discovered by analyzing a karyogram of the individual. Autosomal translocations can be responsible for a number of diseases, ranging from cancer to schizophrenia. Unlike single gene disorders, diseases caused by aneuploidy are the result of improper gene dosage, not nonfunctional gene product.

See also
 Aneuploidy (abnormal number of chromosomes)
 Autosomal dominant
 Autosomal recessive
 Homologous chromosome
 Pseudoautosomal region
 XY sex-determination system
Genetic disorder

References

Chromosomes
Cytogenetics